The Paris Sewer Museum, is a museum located in the sewers at the , near the pont de l'Alma, in the 7th arrondissement of Paris, France. It is closed for renovation and to allow its accessibility to the disabled from July 2, 2018 until end-2020.

History and description 

Organized tours of the sewers were first offered in 1889. Tours were available twice monthly, and visitors were transported through the sewers on boats and wagons.

The museum details the history of the sewers from their initial development by Hugues Aubriot, provost of Paris in the late 14th century, to their modern structure, which was designed in the 19th century by the engineer Eugène Belgrand. The museum also details the role of sewer workers and methods of water treatment.

Location 
The museum is accessible by metro on line 9 at Alma-Marceau station, by RER train line C at Pont de l'Alma station, and by bus lines 63 and 80 at the Alma-Marceau stop.

See also 

List of museums in Paris

References

External links 
 Official website for the Paris Sewer Museum
 Official tourist information for the Paris Sewer Museum

Buildings and structures in the 7th arrondissement of Paris
Museums in Paris
Local museums in France
Sewerage